This is the official list of titular sees of the Catholic Church included in the Annuario Pontificio. Archiepiscopal sees are shown in bold.

The Italian-language Annuario Pontificio devotes some 200 pages to listing these sees, with up to a dozen names on each page. It gives their names in Latin (which are generally the names used also in English) as well as in Italian, and indicates the ancient Roman province to which most of them belonged or other geographical particulars, their status as metropolitan see or suffragan see (of episcopal or archiepiscopal rank), and basic biographical information about their current bishops.

A

 Abaradira
 Abari
 Abbir Germaniciana (Africa proconsularis)
 Abbir Maius (Africa proconsularis)
 Abercornia
 Abernethia
 Abidda
 Abila in Palaestina
 Abila Lysaniae
 Abitinae
 Abora (Africa Proconsularis)
 Abrittum
 Absa Salla (Africa proconsularis)
 Absorus
 Abthugni (Africa proconsularis)
 Abula
 Abydus
 Abziri (Africa proconsularis)
 Acalissus
 Acarassus
 Acci
 Accia
 Acelum
 Achelous
 Acholla
 Achrida (Ohrid)
 Achyraus
 Acilisene
 Acmonia
 Acrassus
 Acropolis
 Acufida
 Adada
 Adana (Armenian Catholic Church)
 Adana (Melkite Catholic Church)
 Adraa
 Adramyttium
 Adrasus
 Adulis
 
 Aeclanum
 Aegae
 Aegeae
 Aegina
 Aela
 Aeliae
 Aemona
 Aenus
 Aëtus
 Aezani
 Africa
 Afufenia
 Agathonice
 Agathopolis
 Agbia (Africa)
 Aggar
 Aggersel
 Agnus
 Agrippias
 Aguntum
 Aggersel
 Alabanda
 Ala Miliaria
 Alava
 Alba
 Alba Maritima
 Albulae
 Aleria
 Alexandria Minor
 Alexanum
 Algiza
 Alia
 Aliezira
 Alinda
 Allegheny
 Alphocranon
 Altava
 Altiburus (Africa)
 Altinum
 Alton
 Amadassa
 Amaia
 Amantia
 Amasea
 Amastris
 Amathus in Cypro
 Amathus in Palaestina
 Amaura
 Ambia
 Amblada
 Amida (Armenian Catholic Church and Syriac Catholic Church)
 Amisus
 Amiternum
 Ammaedara
 Ammoniace
 Amorium
 Amphipolis
 Ampora
 Amudarsa
 Amyzon
 Anaea
 Anasartha
 Anastasiopolis
 Anatetarte
 Anazarbus
 Anbar (Chaldean Catholic Church)
 Anchialus
 Ancusa
 Ancyra (Armenian Catholic Church and Latin Church)
 Ancyra Ferrea
 Andeda
 Andrapa
 Andropolis
 Anemurium
 Anglona, Pandosia
 Anineta
 Antaeopolis
 Antandrus
 Antarados
 Anthedon
 Antigonea
 Antiphellus
 Antiphrae
 Antinoë
 Antiochia ad Maeandrum
 Antiochia in Pisidia
 Antiochia Parva
 Antipatris
 Antipyrgos
 Antium
 Apamea Cibotus
 Apamea in Bithynia
 Apamea in Syria (Maronite Church, Melkite Catholic Church and Syriac Catholic Church)
 Aperlae
 Aphnaeum
 Aphroditopolis
 Apisa Maius (Africa)
 Apollonia
 Apollonia Salbace
 Apollonias
 Apollonis
 Apollonopolis Magna
 Apollonopolis Parva
 Apollonos-Hieron
 Appia
 Appiaria
 Aprus
 Apta
 Aptuca (Africa)
 Aquae Albae in Byzacena
 Aquae Albae in Mauretania
 Aquae in Byzacena
 Aquae in Dacia
 Aquae in Mauretania
 Aquae in Numidia
 Aquae in Proconsulari (Africa)
 Aquae Flaviae
 Aquae Novae in Numidia
 Aquae Novae in Proconsulari (Africa Proconsularis)
 Aquae Regiae
 Aquae Sirenses
 Aquae Thibilitanae
 Aquaviva
 Aquileia Patriarchate (in Italy)
 Aquipendium
 Arabia
 Arabissus
 Arad
 Aradi
 Aradus
 Arae in Mauretania
 Arae in Numidia
 Arausio
 Araxa
 Arba
 Arbanum
 Arcadia
 Arcadiopolis in Asia
 Arcadiopolis in Europa
 Arca in Armenia
 Arca in Phoenicia (Latin Church and Maronite Church)
 Arcavica
 Archelaïs
 Ardamerium
 Árd Carna
 Árd Mór
 Árd Sratha
 Arena
 Areopolis
 Arethusa (Latin Church and Syriac Catholic Church)
 Argos
 Ariarathia
 Ariassus
 Arindela
 Arisitum
 Aristium
 Arna
 Arneae
 Arpi
 Arsacal
 Arsamosata
 Arsennaria
 Arsinoë in Arcadia
 Arsinoë in Cypro
 Artvin (Armenian Catholic Church)
 Arycanda
 Ascalon
 Aspendus
 Aspona
 Assava
 Assuras
 Assus
 Astigi
 Astypalaea
 Asuoremixta
 Atella
 Atenia
 Athribis
 Ath Truim
 Athyra
 Attaea
 Attalea in Lydia
 Attalea in Pamphylia
 Attanasus
 Attuda
 Auca
 Aufinium
 Augurus
 Augusta
 Augustopolis in Palaestina
 Augustopolis in Phrygia
 Aulon (Aulonensis)
 Aulon (Aulonitanus)
 Aureliopolis in Asia
 Aureliopolis in Lydia
 Aurocla
 Aurusuliana
 Ausafa
 Ausana (Africa)
 Ausuaga (Africa)
 Ausuccura
 Autenti
 Auzegera
 Auzia
 Aveia
 Africa Avensa (Africa)
 Avioccala (Africa)
 Avissa (Africa)
 Avitta Bibba
 Axomis
 Azotus
 Azura (diocese)

B

 Bahanna
 Babylon
 Babra
 Bacanaria
 Bacatha in Arabia
 Bacatha in Palaestina
 Badiae
 Bagai
 Bagis
 Balneoregium
 Baia
 Balanea
 Balbura
 Balecium
 Baliana
 Bamaccora
 Bapara
 Bararus
 Barata
 Barbalissus
 Barca
 Barcusus
 Bardstown
 Bareta
 Bargala
 Bargylia
 Barica
 Baris in Hellesponto
 Baris in Pisidia
 Basilinopolis
 Bassiana
 Basti
 Batnae (Syriac Catholic Church)
 Bavagaliana
 Beatia
 Bela
 Belabitene
 Belali
 Bellicastrum
 Belesasa
 Bencenna
 Benda
 Benepota
 Beneventum
 Bennefa
 Beroea
 Berenice
 Berissa
 Beroë
 Berrhoea
 Betagbara
 Bethleem
 Bettonium
 Bethzabda
 Beverlacum
 Biccari
 Bida
 Bigastro
 Bilta
 Binda
 Birtha
 Bisarchio
 Bisica
 Bistue
 Bisuldino
 Bitettum
 Bitylius
 Bizya
 Bladia
 Blanda Iulia
 Blaundus
 Blera
 Bonitza
 Bononia
 Bonusta
 Boreum
 Bosana
 Bosporus
 Bostra
 Botrys
 Botriana
 Brixellum
 Bria
 Briancio
 Britonia
 Briula
 Bruzus
 Brysis
 Bubastis
 Bubon
 Bucellus
 Budua
 Buffada
 Buleliana
 Bulgarophygum
 Bulla
 Bulla Regia
 Bulna
 Burca
 Bure
 Buruni
 Busiris
 Buslacena
 Butus
 Buthrotum
 Buxentum
 Byblus

C

 Cabarsussi
 Cabasa
 Cabellicum
 Cadi
 Caeciri
 Caelanum
 Caere
 Caesarea in Bithynia
 Caesarea in Cappadocia (Armenian Catholic Church and Melkite Catholic Church)
 Caesarea Philippi
 Caesarea in Mauretania
 Caesarea in Numidia
 Caesarea in Palaestina
 Caesarea in Thessalia
 Caesariana
 Caesaropolis
 Caffa
 Calama
 Caldas de Reyes
 Caliabria
 California
 Callinicum
 Callipolis
 Caloe
 Caltadria
 Calydon
 Calynda
 Camachus
 Campania
 Camplum
 Camuliana
 Canapium
 Canatha
 Candyba
 Cannae
 Canosa
 Cantanus
 Capitolias
 Capra
 Capreae
 Caprulae
 Capsa
 Capsus
 Caput Cilla
 Carac-Moba
 Carallia
 Cardabunta
 Cardicium
 Cariana
 Carini
 Carinola
 
 Carpasia
 Carpathus
 Carpentrassum
 Carrhae
 Carthage
 Cartennae
 Carystus
 Casae Calanae
 Casae in Numidia
 Casae in Pamphylia
 Casae Medianae
 Casae Nigrae
 Casius
 Cassandria
 Castabala
 Castello
 Castellum Iabar
 Castellum in Mauretania
 Castellum in Numidia
 Castellum Medianum
 Castellum Minus
 Castellum Ripae
 Castellum Tatroportus
 Castellum Tingitii
 Castellum Titulianum
 Castoria
 Castra Galbae
 Castra Martis
 Castra Nova
 Castra Severiana
 Castro di Puglia
 Castro di Sardegna
 Castrum
 Castulo
 Catabum Castra
 Cataquas
 Catrum
 Catula
 Caudium
 Caunus
 Cea
 Ceanannus Mór
 Cebarades
 Cedamusa
 Cediae
 Cefa
 Cefala
 Celerina
 Cellae in Mauretania
 Cellae in Proconsulari
 Cell Ausaille
 Cemerianus
 Cenae
 Cenculiana
 Centenaria
 Centuria
 Centuriones
 Ceramus
 Ceramussa
 Cerasa
 Cerasus
 Cerbali
 Cercina
 Ceretapa
 Cerynia
 Cernitza
 Cestrus
 Chaialum (Syro-Malabar Catholic Church)
 Chalcedonia
 Chalcis in Europa
 Chalcis in Graecia
 Chalcis in Syria
 Chariopolis
 Chelm
 Chersonesus in Creta
 Chersonesus in Europa
 Chersonesus in Zechia
 Chiemium
 Chimaera
 Choma
 Chonochora
 Chullu
 Chunavia
 Christianopolis
 Christopolis
 Chrysopolis in Arabia
 Chrysopolis in Macedonia
 Chusra
 Chytri
 Cibalae
 Cibaliana
 Cibyra
 Cidramus
 Cidyessus
 Cilibia
 Cillium
 Cincari
 Cinna
 Cinnaborium
 Cynopolis in Aegypto
 Cynopolis in Arcadia
 Circesium
 Cisamus
 Ciscissus
 Cissa
 Cissi
 Cissita
 Citharizum
 Citium
 Citrus
 Città Ducale
 Cius
 Civitate
 Claneus
 Claternae
 Claudiopolis in Honoriade
 Claudiopolis in Isauria
 Clazomenae
 Cleopatris
 Cluain Iraird
 Cluentum
 Clypia
 Clysma
 Cnidus
 Cnossus
 Codaca
 Codrula
 Coela
 Coeliana
 Colbasa
 Colophon
 Colonia in Armenia
 Colonia in Cappadocia
 Colossae
 Columnata
 Colybrassus
 Comama
 Comana Armeniae
 Comana Pontica
 Comba
 Conana
 Concordia in America
 Cone
 Constantia in Arabia
 Constantia in Thracia
 Constantina
 Coprithis
 Coptus
 Coracesium
 Corada
 Corbavia
 Corinthus
 Corna
 Corniculana
 Corone
 Coronea
 Coropissus
 Corycus
 Corydala
 Cos
 Cotenna
 Cotrada
 Cotyaeum
 Cova
 
 Cratia
 Cremna
 Crepedula
 Cresima
 Croae
 Cubda
 Cufruta
 Cucusus
 Cuicul
 Culusi
 Cuncacestre
 Cunga Féichin
 Cumae
 Curium
 Cursola
 Curubis
 Cures Sabinorum
 Cusae
 Cyanae
 Cybistra
 Cyme
 Cyparissia
 Cypsela
 Cyrene
 Cyrrhus
 Cyzicus

D

 Dadibra
 Dadima
 Dagnum
 Daimlaig
 Daldis
 Dalisandus in Isauria
 Dalisandus in Pamphylia
 Damascus
 Damiata (Melkite Catholic Church)
 Danaba
 Daonium
 Daphnusia
 Daphnutium
 Dara (Syriac Catholic Church)
 Dardanus
 Darnis
 Dascylium
 Daulia
 Dausara
 Decoriana
 Demetrias
 Derbe
 Dercos
 Deultum
 Diana
 Dianum
 Dices
 Diocaesarea in Isauria
 Diocaesarea in Palaestina
 Dioclea
 Diocletiana
 Diocletianopolis in Palaestina
 Diocletianopolis in Thracia
 Diocletianopolis in Thebaide
 Dionysias
 Dionysiana
 Dionysiopolis
 Dioshieron
 Diospolis Inferior
 Diospolis in Thracia
 Diospolis Superior
 Dium
 Doara (Eastern Catholic Churches)
 Doberus
 Docimium
 Doclea
 Dodona
 Dolia
 Doliche
 Dometiopolis
 Domnach Sechnaill
 Dora
 Dorylaeum
 Dragobitia
 Dragonara
 Drivastum
 Drizipara
 Drua
 Drusiliana
 Dumium
 Dystis

E

 Eanach Dúin
 Electa
 Ecdaumava
 Echinus
 Ecsalus
 Edessa in Macedonia
 Edessa in Osrhoëne (Melkite Catholic Church and Syriac Catholic Church
 Edistiana
 Egabro
 Egara
 Egnatia
 Egnazia Appula
 Eguga
 Elaea
 Elatea
 Elephantaria in Mauretania
 Elephantaria in Proconsulari
 Elepla
 Eleutherna
 Eleutheropolis in Macedonia
 Eleutheropolis in Palaestina
 Elicroca
 Elis
 Elmhama
 Elo
 Elusa
 Elvas
 Eminentiana
 Emmaüs
 Enera
 Ephesus
 Epidaurum
 Epiphania in Cilicia
 Epiphania in Syria
 Equilium
 Equizetum
 Eraclea
 Erdonia
 Eressus
 Eriza
 Erra
 Erythrae
 Erythrum
 Erzerum (Armenian Catholic Church)
 Esbus
 Etenna
 Euaza
 Euchaitae
 Eucarpia
 Eudocia
 Eudocias
 Eudoxias
 Eumenia
 Euroea in Epiro
 Euroea in Phoenicia
 Europus
 Eutyme
 Ezero

F

 Falerii
 Falerone
 Fallaba
 Famagusta
 Fata
 Faustinopolis
 Febiana
 Feradi Maius
 Feradi Minus
 Ferentium
 Fesseë
 Ficus
 Fidenae
 Fidoloma
 Filaca
 Fiorentino
 Fissiana
 Flavias
 Flumenpiscense
 Flenucleta
 Floriana
 Flumenzer
 Foratiana
 Forconium
 Forma
 Formiae
 Forontoniana
 Forum Flaminii
 Forum Novum
 Forum Popilii
 Forum Traiani
 Fundi
 Frequentium
 Fronta
 Fuerteventura
 Furnos Maior
 Furnos Minor
 Fussala

G

 Gabae
 Gabala
 Gabii
 Gabula
 Gadara
 Gadiaufala
 Gaguari
 Galazia in Campania
 Gallesium
 Galtelli
 Gangra
 Garba
 Gardar
 Garella
 Gargara
 Garriana
 Gaudiaba
 Gauriana
 Gaza
 Gazera
 Gegi
 Gemellae in Byzacena
 Gemellae in Numidia
 Gera
 Gerara
 Gerasa
 Gergis
 Germa in Hellesponto
 Germa in Galatia
 Germania in Dacia
 Germania in Numidia
 Germanicia
 Germaniciana
 Germanicopolis
 Germia
 Gibba
 Gigthi
 Gilba
 Gindarus
 Girba
 Giru Marcelli
 Giru Mons
 Girus
 Girus Tarasii
 Gisipa
 Giufi
 Giufi Salaria
 Glastonia
 Glavinitza
 Glenndálocha
 Gomphi
 Gor
 Gordus
 Gordoserba
 Gortyna
 Gradisca
 Gradum
 Grass Valley
 Gratiana
 Gratianopolis
 Gravelbourg
 Grumentum
 Guardialfiera
 Gubaliana
 Gummi in Byzacena
 Gummi in Proconsulari
 Gunela
 Gunugus
 Gurza
 Guzabeta

H

 Hadrianae
 Hadriani ad Olympum
 Hadriania
 Hadrianopolis in Haemimonto
 Hadrianopolis in Epiro
 Hadrianopolis in Honoriade
 Hadrianopolis in Pisidia
 Hadrianotherae
 Hadrumetum
 Halicarnassus
 Harpasa
 Hebron
 Helenopolis in Bithynia
 Helenopolis in Palaestina
 Heliopolis in Augustamnica
 Heliopolis in Phoenicia
 Heliosebaste
 Helos
 Hemeria
 Hemesa
 Hephaestus
 Heraclea ad Latmum
 Heraclea in Europa
 Heraclea Pelagoniae
 Heraclea Pontica
 Heraclea Salbace
 Heracleopolis Magna
 Herdonia
 Hermiana
 Hermocapelia
 Hermonthis
 Hermopolis Parva
 Hexamilium
 Hierapolis in Isauria
 Hierapolis in Phrygia
 Hierapolis in Syria (Melkite Catholic Church and Syriac Catholic Church)
 Hierapytna
 Hierissus
 Hierocaesarea
 Hieron
 Hieropolis
 Hierpiniana
 Hilta
 Hippo Diarrhytus
 Hirina
 Hirta
 Hispellum
 Hodelm (Hoddam)
 Hólar
 Homona
 Horaea
 Horrea
 Horrea Aninici
 Horrea Coelia
 Horreomargum
 Horta
 Hortanum, Horta
 Hospita
 Hyccara
 Hyda in Lycaonia
 Hyllarima
 Hypaepa
 Hypselis
 Hyrcanis

I

 Iabruda
 Iamnia
 Iasus
 Ibora
 Iconium
 Ida in Mauretania
 Idassa
 Idebessus
 Idicra
 Ierafi
 Ierichus
 Igilgilli
 Ilistra
 Iliturgi
 Ilium
 Illici
 Ingila
 Inis Cathaig
 Insula
 Intervallum
 Iomnium
 Ionopolis
 Ioppe
 Ios
 Iotapa in Isauria
 Iotapa in Palaestina
 Ipagro
 Ipsus
 Irenopolis in Cilicia
 Irenopolis in Isauria
 Iria Flavia
 Isauropolis
 Isba
 Isinda
 Ita
 Italica
 Iubaltiana
 Iucundiana
 Iuliopolis
 Iulium Carnicum
 Iunca in Byzacena
 Iunca in Mauretania
 Iziriana
 Izirzada

J
 Jamestown
 Justiniana Prima
 Justinianopolis in Galatia

K

 Kashkar (Chaldean Catholic Church)
 Kearney
 Kharput (Armenian Catholic Church)

L

 Labicum
 Lacedaemonia
 Lacubaza
 Lagania
 Lagina
 La Imperial
 Lamasba
 Lambaesis
 Lambiridi
 Lamdia
 Lamia
 Lamiggiga
 Lamphua
 Lampsacus
 Lamsorti
 Lamus
 Lamzella
 Laodicea ad Libanum
 Laodicea Combusta
 Laodicea in Phrygia
 Laodicea in Syria
 Lapda
 Lapithus
 Lappa
 Laranda
 Lares
 Lari Castellum
 Larissa in Syria
 Larissa in Thessalia
 Latopolis
 Lauriacum
 Lauzadus
 Lavellum
 Lead
 Leavenworth
 Lebedus
 Lebessus
 Leges
 Legia
 Legis Volumni
 Lemellefa
 Lemfocta
 Lemnus
 Leontium
 Leontopolis in Augustamnica
 Leontopolis in Pamphylia
 Leptiminus
 Leptis Magna
 Lerus
 Lesina
 Lestrona
 Lesvi
 Lete
 Letopolis
 Leucas
 Leuce
 Liberalia
 Libertina
 Lidoricium
 Lilybaeum
 Limata
 Limisa
 Limnae
 Limyra
 Lindisfarne
 Linoë
 Lipara
 Lititza
 Litomyšl
 Litterae
 Livias
 Lizicus
 Lorium
 Loryma
 Lugmad
 Lugura
 Lunda
 Luni
 Lupadium
 Luperciana
 Luxemburgum
 Lycaonia
 Lydda
 Lyrbe
 Lysias
 Lysinia
 Lystra

M

 Macomades
 Macomades Rusticiana
 Macon
 Macra
 Macri
 Macriana in Mauretania
 Macriana Maior
 Macriana Minor
 Mactaris
 Madarsuma
 Madaurus
 Mades
 Madytus
 Maeonia
 Magarmel
 Mageó
 Magnesia ad Maeandrum
 Magnesia ad Sipylum
 Magnetum
 Magydus
 Maillezais
 Maina
 Maiuca
 Maiumas Gazae
 Malliana
 Mallus
 Malus
 Manaccenser
 Maraguia
 Marasc (Armenian Catholic Church)
 Marazanae
 Marazanae Regiae
 Marcelliana
 Marciana
 Marcianopolis
 Marcopolis
 Mardin (Armenian Catholic Church, Chaldean Catholic Church, and Syriac Catholic Church)
 Mareotes
 Margum
 Mariamme
 Mariana in Corsica
 Marianopolis in Michigania (Sault Ste. Marie, Michigan)
 Marida
 Marmarizana
 Maronana
 Maronea
 Martanae Tudertinorum
 Martirano
 Martyropolis
 Masclianae
 Mascula
 Massa Lubrense
 Mastaura in Asia
 Mastaura in Lycia
 Masuccaba
 Materiana
 Mathara in Numidia
 Mathara in Proconsulari
 Matrega
 Mattiana
 Maturba
 Maura
 Mauriana
 Maximianae
 Maximiana in Byzacena
 Maximiana in Numidia
 Maximianopolis in Arabia
 Maximianopolis in Palaestina
 Maximianopolis in Pamphylia
 Maximianopolis in Rhodope
 Maximianopolis in Thebaide
 Maxita
 Maxula Prates
 Mazaca
 Medaba
 Medea
 Medeli
 Media
 Mediana
 Medianas Zabuniorum
 Megalopolis in Peloponneso
 Megalopolis in Proconsulari
 Megara
 Mela
 Melitene (Armenian Catholic Church and Latin Church)
 Meloë in Isauria
 Meloë in Lycia
 Melzi
 Membressa
 Memphis
 Menefessi
 Menelaites
 Menois
 Mentesa
 Mercia
 Merus
 Mesarfelta
 Mesembria
 Mesotymolus
 Messene
 Meta
 Metaba
 Metelis
 Metellopolis
 Methone
 Methymna
 Metrae
 Metropolis in Asia
 Metropolis in Pisidia
 Metropolis of Kastoria
 Mevania
 Mibiarca
 Midaëum
 Midica
 Mididi
 Midila
 Migirpa
 Miletopolis
 Miletus
 Milevum
 Mimiana
 Mina
 Minervium
 Minora
 Minturnae
 Misenum
 Missua
 Misthia
 Mitylene
 Mizigi
 Mnizus
 Mocissus
 Modra
 Modruš
 Moglaena
 Molicunza
 Monembasia
 Mons in Mauretania
 Mons in Numidia
 Montecorvino
 Montefiascone
 Monterano
 Monteverde
 Mopsuestia
 Mopta
 Morosbisdus
 Mossyna
 Mostene
 Mosynopolis
 Motula
 Moxori
 Mozotcori
 Mulia
 Mulli
 Munatiana
 Mundinitza
 Municipa
 Murcona
 Murthlacum
 Murustaga
 Musbanda
 Mush (Armenian Catholic Church)
 Musti
 Musti in Numidia
 Muteci
 Mutia
 Mutugenna
 Muzuca in Byzacena
 Muzuca in Proconsulari
 Mylasa
 Myndus
 Myra (Melkite Catholic Church and Latin Church)
 Myrica
 Myrina

N

 Nabala
 Nachingwea
 Nacolia
 Naiera
 Naissus
 Nara
 Naraggara
 Naratcata
 Narona
 Nasai
 Nasala
 Nasbinca
 Natchesium
 Natchitoches
 Naucratis
 Nauplia
 Nazianzus
 Nationa
 Nea Aule
 Neapolis in Arabia
 Neapolis in Caria
 Neapolis in Cypro
 Neapolis in Isauria
 Neapolis in Palaestina
 Neapolis in Pisidia
 Neapolis in Proconsulari
 Nea Valentia
 Nebbi
 
 Neila
 Neocaesarea (episcopal see)
 Neocaesarea in Bithynia
 Neocaesarea in Ponto
 Neocaesarea in Syria
 Novae Patrae
 Nepeta
 Nepte
 Nesqually
 Neve
 Newport
 Nicaea
 Nicaea Parva
 Nicius
 Nicives
 Nicomedia
 Nicolopolis ad Iaterum
 Nicopolis ad Nestum
 Nicopolis in Armenia
 Nicopolis in Epiro
 Nicopsis
 Nicosia
 Nigizubi
 Nigrae Maiores
 Nilopolis
 Nisa in Lycia
 Nisibis (Chaldean Catholic Church and Maronite Catholic Church)
 Nisyrus
 Noba
 Nomentum
 Nona
 Nova
 Nova Barbara
 Nova Caesaris
 Nova Germania
 Novaliciana
 Nova Petra
 Nova Sinna
 Nova Sparsa
 Novae
 Novi
 Novica
 Nubia
 Numana or Humana
 Numericus
 Numida
 Numluli
 Nysa in Asia
 Nyssa

O

 Oasis Magna
 Obba
 Obori
 Oca
 Octaba
 Octabia
 Octava
 Odessus
 Oëa
 Oenoanda
 Oescus
 Olba
 Olbia
 Olena
 Olympus
 Oliva
 Ombi
 Onchesmus
 Onuphis
 Opitergium
 Opus
 Oppidum Consillinum
 Oppidum Novum
 Orcistus
 Oregon City
 Oreus
 Oreto
 Orthosias in Caria
 Orthosias in Phoenicia
 Orymna
 Ostra
 Ostracine
 Othana
 Othona
 Otriculum
 Otrus
 Ottocium
 Oxyrhynchus

P

 Pachnemunis
 Paestum
 Palaeopolis in Asia
 Palaeopolis in Pamphylia
 Palmyra
 Paltus
 Pamphilus
 Panatoria
 Penephysis
 Pandosia, Anglona
 Panemotichus
 Panium
 Panopolis
 Paphus
 Pappa
 Paraetonium
 Paralus
 Parembolae in Arabia
 Parembolae in Palaestina
 Paria
 Parium
 Parlais
 Parthenia
 Parus
 Patara
 Patrae
 Pausulae
 Pauzera
 Pedachtoë
 Pederodiana
 Pegae
 Pella
 Peltae
 Pelusium (Latin Church and Melkite Catholic Church)
 Penafiel
 Perdices
 Pergamum
 Perge
 Peristasis
 Peritheorium
 Perperene
 Perrhe
 Pertusa
 Pessinus
 Petina
 Petinessus
 Pednelissus
 Petra in Aegypto
 Petra in Lazica
 Petra in Palaestina
 Phacusa
 Phaena
 Pharan
 Pharbaetus
 Pharsalus
 Phaselis
 Phasis
 Phatanus
 Phelbes
 Phellus
 Philadelphia in Arabia
 Philadelphia in Lydia
 Philadelphia Minor
 Philae
 Philippi
 Philippopolis in Arabia
 Philippopolis in Thracia
 Philomelium
 Phoba
 Phocaea
 Phoenice
 Photice
 Phragonis
 Phulli
 Phytea
 Pia
 Pinara
 Pinhel
 Pionia
 Pisita
 Pitanae
 Plataea
 Platamon
 Plestia
 Ploaghe
 Plotinopolis
 Pocofeltus
 Podalia
 Poemanenum
 Poetovium
 Pogla
 Polemonium
 Polybotus
 Polinianum
 Polymartium
 Polystylus
 Pomaria
 Pompeiopolis in Cilicia
 Pompeiopolis in Paphlagonia
 Populonia
 Porphyreon
 Porthmus
 Potentiz in Piceno
 Praenetus
 Praesidium
 Precausa
 Preslavus
 Priene
 Privata
 Proconnesus
 Prostanna
 Prusa (Armenian Catholic Church and Latin Church)
 Prusias ad Hypium
 Prymnessus
 Pselchis
 Psibela
 Ptolemais in Libya
 Ptolemais in Phoenicia (Latin Church and Maronite Church)
 Ptolemais in Thebaide
 Pudentiana
 Pulcheriopolis
 Pumentum
 Pupiana
 Puppi
 Putia in Byzacena
 Putia in Numidia
 Pyrgos

Q

 Quaestoriana, Byzacena (Tunisia)
 Quincy (Illinois, USA)
 Quiza (El-Benian, Algeria)

R

 Rachlea
 Raphanea
 Raphia
 Ramsbiria
 Rapidum
 Ratiaria
 Rebellum
 Regiana
 Regiae
 Remesiana
 Reperi
 Respecta, Numidia
 Ressiana
 Rew-Ardashir (Chaldean Catholic Church)
 Rhaedestus
 Rhandus
 Rhasus
 Rhesaina
 Rhinocorura
 Rhizaeum
 Rhodiapolis
 Rhodopolis
 Rhoga
 Rhoina
 Rhosus
 Rhusium
 Risinium
 Ros Cré
 Rota
 Rossmarkaeum
 Rotaria
 Rotdon
 Rubicon
 Rufiniana
 Rusada
 Rusguniae
 Rusellae
 Rusicade
 Ruspae
 Rusubbicari
 Rusubisir
 Rusuca
 Rusuccuru (Titular See)
 Rutabo

S

 Sabadia
 Sebana
 Sabrata
 Saepinum
 Saesina
 Saetabis
 Sagalassus
 Sagone
 Saia Maior
 Saint-Papoul
 Sais
 Saittae
 Sala
 Salamias
 Salamis
 Saldae
 Salona
 Salapia
 Samos
 Samosata
 Sanavus
 Sanctus Germanus
 Sanitium
 San Leone
 Santa Giusta
 Sarda
 Sardes
 Sarepta (Latin Church and Maronite Church)
 Sariphaea
 Sarsenterum
 Sasabe
 Sasima
 Sassura
 Sata
 Satafi
 Satafis
 Satala in Armenia
 Satala in Lydia
 Satrianum
 Sauatra
 Sbida
 Scala
 Scsampa
 Scardona
 Scarphea
 Scebatiana
 Scepsis
 Schedia
 Sciathus
 Scilium
 Scopelus in Haemimonto
 Scopelus in Thessalia
 Scutarium
 Scyrus
 Scythopolis
 Sebarga
 Sebaste (Armenian Catholic Church)
 Sebastea
 Sebaste in Cilicia
 Sebaste in Phrygia
 Sebaste in Palaestina
 Sebastopolis in Abasgia
 Sebastopolis in Armenia
 Sebastopolis in Thracia
 Sebela
 Sebennytus
 Seert (Chaldean Catholic Church)
 Segermes
 Segia
 Segisama
 Seina
 Sela
 Selemselae
 Selendeta
 Seleucia in Isauria
 Seleucia Ferrea
 Seleucia Pieria
 Seleuciana
 Seleucobelus
 Selge
 Selia
 Selinus
 Selsea
 Selymbria
 Semina
 Semnea
 Semta
 Serbia
 Sereddeli
 Sergentza
 Sergiopolis
 Serigene
 Serra
 Serrae
 Serta
 Sesta
 Setea
 Sethroë
 Septimunicia
 Severiana
 Sfasferia
 Sibidunda
 Siblia
 Sicca Veneria
 Siccenna
 Siccesi
 Sicilibba
 Syca
 Sicyon
 Side
 Sidnacestre
 Sidon
 Sidyma
 Sigus
 Sila
 Silandus
 Silli
 Silyum
 Simidicca
 Simingi
 Siminina
 Simitthu
 Sinda
 Siniandus
 Sinitis
 Sinna
 Sinnada in Mauretania
 Sinnipsa
 Sinnuara
 Sinope
 Sion
 Sita
 Sitifis
 Sitipa
 Skálholt
 Slebte
 Socia
 Soldaia
 Soli
 Sophene
 Sora
 Sorres
 Soteropolis
 Sozopolis in Haemimonto
 Sozopolis in Pisidia
 Sozusa in Libya
 Sozusa in Palaestina
 Stadia
 Stagnum
 Stagoi
 Stauropolis
 Stephaniacum
 Stectorium
 Stobi
 Strathernia
 Stratonicea in Caria
 Stratonicea in Lydia
 Strongoli
 Strongyle
 Strumnitza
 Suacia
 Suas
 Suava
 Subaugusta
 Subbar
 Subrita
 Sucarda
 Succuba
 Suelli
 Sufar
 Sufasar
 Sufes
 Sufetula
 Sugdaea
 Sulci
 Suliana
 Sullectum
 Summa
 Summula
 Sura
 Surista
 Sutrium
 Sutunura
 Sycomazon
 Syedra
 Syene
 Synaus
 Synnada in Phrygia

T

 Tabae
 Tabaicara, Mauretania Caesariensis
 Tabala, Lydia
 Tabalta
 Tabbora
 Tabla, Mauretania Caesariensis
 Taborenta, Mauretania Caesariensis
 Tabuda, Numidia
 Tabunia, Mauretania Caesariensis
 Tacapae
 Tacarata, Numidia
 Tacia Montana, Africa (Roman province)
 Tadamata
 Taddua
 Taenarum, Laconia
 Tagarata
 Tagarbala
 Tagaria
 Tagase
 Tagritum (Syriac Catholic Church)
 Taium
 Talaptula
 Tamada
 Tamagrista
 Tamallula
 Tamalluma
 Tamascani
 Tamasus
 Tamata
 Tamazeni
 Tamazuca
 Tambeae
 Tamiathis
 Tanagra
 Tanais
 Tanaramusa
 Tanis
 Tanudaia
 Taparura
 Tapasa
 Taraqua
 Tarasa in Byzacena
 Tarasa in Numidia
 Tarsus (Latin Church, Maronite Church, and Melkite Catholic Church)
 Tasaccora
 Tatilti
 Taua
 Taurianum
 Tauromenium
 Tavium
 Tegea
 Teglata in Numidia
 Teglata in Proconsulari
 Tela
 Telde
 Tell-Mahrê
 Telmissus
 Temenothyrae
 Temnus
 Temuniana
 Tenedus
 Tentyris
 Teos
 Tepelta
 Terenuthis
 Termessus
 Ternobus
 Tetci
 Teuchira
 Thabraca
 Thagamuta
 Thagaste
 Thagora
 Thala
 Thamugadi
 Thapsus
 Tharros
 Thasbalta
 Thasus
 Thaumacus
 Thebae
 Thebae Phthiotides
 Thelepte
 Themisonium
 Thenae
 Thennesus
 Theodoropolis
 Theodosiopolis in Arcadia
 Theodosiopolis in Armenia
 Thermae Basilicae
 Thermae Himerae
 Thérouanne
 Thespiae
 Thessalonica
 Theudalis
 Theuzi
 Theveste
 Thiava
 Thibaris
 Thibica
 Thibilis
 Thibiuca
 Thibuzabetum
 Thiges
 Thignica
 Thimida
 Thimida Regia
 Thinis
 Thinisa in Numidia
 Thisiduo
 Thizica
 Thmuis
 Thois
 Thubunae in Numidia
 Thuburbo Maius
 Thuburbo Minus
 Thuburnica
 Thubursicum
 Thubursicum-Bure
 Thuccabora
 Thucca in Mauretania
 Thucca in Numidia
 Thucca Terebenthina
 Thugga
 Thunigaba
 Thunudruma
 Thunusuda
 Thurio
 Thyatira
 Thysdrus
 Tiberias
 Tiberiopolis
 Tiburnia
 Tiddi
 Tigamibena
 Tigava
 Tigias
 Tigillava
 Tigimma
 Tigisis in Mauretania (Taourga, Algeria)
 Tigisis in Numidia (Aïn el-Bordj, Algeria)
 Tiguala
 Timici
 Timidana
 Tingaria
 Tinis in Proconsulari
 Tinista
 Tinum
 Tipasa in Mauretania
 Tipasa in Numidia
 Tisedi
 Tisili
 Titiopolis
 Tituli in Numidia
 Tituli in Proconsulari
 Tityassus
 Tium
 Tlos
 Tokat (Armenian Catholic Church)
 Tomi
 Tongeren/Tongres
 Torcello
 Tortibulum
 Tracula
 Tragurium
 Traianopolis in Phrygia
 Traianopolis in Rhodope
 Traiectum ad Mosam
 Tralles in Asia
 Tralles in Lydia
 Transmarisca
 Trapezopolis
 Trapezus (Latin Church and Armenian Catholic Church)
 Treba
 Trebenna
 Trebia
 Trecalae
 Tremithus
 Tres Tabernae
 Trevico
 Tricca
 Tripolis in Lydia
 Tripolis in Phoenicia
 Trisipa
 Troas
 Trocmades
 Troezene
 Trofimiana
 Troyna
 Truentum
 Tubernuca
 Tubia
 Tubulbaca
 Tubunae in Mauretania
 Tubusuptu
 Tubyza
 Tucci
 Tulana
 Tullia
 Tunes (Tunis, Tunisia)
 Tunnuna
 Turres Ammeniae, Numidia
 Turres Concordiae, Numidia
 Turres in Byzacena, Byzacena
 Turres in Numidia, Numidia
 Turrisblanda, (Africa) Byzacena
 Turris in Mauretania, Mauretania Caesariensis
 Turris in Proconsulari, Africa Proconsularis
 Turris Rotunda
 Turris Tamalleni
 Turuda
 Turuzi
 Tuscamia
 Tuscania
 Tusuros
 Tyana
 Tymandus, Pisidia
 Tymbrias
 Tyndaris
 Tyriaeum, Pisidia
 Tyrus (Lebanon)
 Tzernicus

U

 Ubaba
 Ubaza
 Uccula
 Uchi Maius
 Ucres
 Ulcinium
 Ulpiana
 Ululi
 Umbriatico
 Unizibira
 Uppenna
 Urbs Salvia
 Urci
 Urima
 Ursona
 Urusi
 Usinaza
 Usula
 Uthina
 Utica
 Utimma
 Utimmira
 Uzalis
 Uzippari
 Uzita

V

 Vada
 Vadesi
 Vaga
 Vagadensi
 Vagal
 Vageata
 Vagrauta
 Vaison
 Valabria
 Valentiniana
 Valentia
 Valeria
 Valliposita
 Vallis
 Vamalia
 Vanariona
 Vannida
 Vardimissa
 Vartana
 Vasada
 Vassinassa
 Vatarba
 Vazari
 Vazari-Didda
 Vazi-Sarra
 Vegesela in Byzacena
 Vegesela in Numidia
 Velebusdus
 Velefi
 Velia
 Velicia
 Verbe
 Vergi
 Verinopolis
 Verissa
 Verrona
 Vertara
 Vescera
 Vibiana
 Vibo
 Vico Equense
 Voghenza
 Victoriana
 Vicus Aterii
 Vicus Augusti
 Vicus Caesaris
 Vicus Pacati
 Vicus Turris
 Villamagna in Proconsulari
 Villamagna in Tripolitania
 Villa Nova
 Villa Regis
 Viminacium
 Vina
 Vincennes
 Vinda
 Virunum
 Vissalsa
 Vita
 Vittoriana
 Voli
 Volsinium
 Volturnum
 Voncaria
 Voncariana
 Vulturaria
 Vulturia

W

 Walla Walla
 Wiener Neustadt

X

 Xanthe
 Xanthus
 Xois

Y
 Ypres (Ieper)

Z

 Zaba
 Zabi
 Zabulon
 Zagylis
 Zaliche
 Zallata
 Zama Major
 Zama Minor
 Zapara
 Zaraï
 Zaratovium
 Zarna
 Zarzela
 Zattara
 Zela
 Zella
 Zenobias
 Zenopolis in Isauria
 Zenopolis in Lycia
 Zephyrium
 Zerta
 Zeugma in Mesopotamia
 Zeugma in Syria
 Ziqua
 Zoara
 Zorava
 Zorolus
 Zucchabar
 Zuri
 Zygana
 Zygris

See also 
For nearly all titular sees in partibus infidelium (formerly Roman/Byzantine, presently Islamic countries):
 List of Catholic dioceses in Algeria
 List of Catholic dioceses in Egypt
 List of Catholic dioceses in Iraq
 List of Catholic dioceses in Lebanon
 List of Catholic dioceses in Libya
 List of Catholic dioceses in Morocco, Mauretania and Western Sahara
 List of Catholic dioceses in Syria
 List of Catholic dioceses in Tunisia

References

Sources and external links 
 GCatholic – titular Metropolitan sees
 GCatholic – titular Archiepiscopal sees
 GCatholic – titular Episcopal sees
 Catholic-hierarchy;org – List of titular sees

 
Titular